The 2020 Inter-Provincial Trophy was the eighth edition of the Inter-Provincial Trophy, a Twenty20 cricket competition played in Ireland during August and September 2020. It was the fourth edition of the competition to be played with full Twenty20 status. Northern Knights were the defending champions.

On the opening day of the tournament, Northern Knights beat North West Warriors by two runs in a match affected by the rain, and Leinster Lightning defeated Munster Reds by nine wickets with twelve overs to spare. Leinster Lightning won the tournament, to claim their sixth title, after beating Northern Knights by five wickets in the penultimate round of matches.

The final two fixtures of the tournament, scheduled to be played on 8 September 2020, were both called off a day before they were meant to be played. The match between Munster Reds and Northern Knights was cancelled because of a possible COVID-19 "chain of transmission" linked back to a cancelled match in the 2020 Bob Willis Trophy in England a few days prior. The other match, between North West Warriors and Leinster Lightning, was called off due to a wet outfield, meaning only half of the scheduled twelve matches finished with a result.

Background
Originally the tournament was scheduled to be held from 12 June to 3 August 2020, with competition split into two halves, each branded as a T20 Festival. The first half was scheduled to be played in June, and the second half was scheduled to be played in August.

On 26 March 2020, Cricket Ireland confirmed that domestic competitions would be pushed back to 28 May 2020 at the earliest, due to the COVID-19 pandemic. Government restrictions prevented any cricket, including training, from starting before June 2020. The Irish government announced a provisional date of 20 July 2020 for a possible restart of sporting fixtures in the country. Plans of a possible start of domestic cricket in Ireland, with matches taking place during August and September, were looked at in July 2020. On 22 July 2020, Cricket Ireland confirmed the revised fixtures for the tournament. On 15 August 2020, all the teams confirmed their squads for the tournament.

Points table
The following teams competed:

Fixtures

References

External links
 Series home at ESPN Cricinfo

Inter
Inter-Provincial Trophy seasons